Chris Fletcher (born December 25, 1948) is a former American football safety in the National Football League (NFL). He was drafted by the San Diego Chargers in the ninth round of the 1970 NFL Draft. He played college football at Temple.

Fletcher played his entire seven-year career for the Chargers from 1970 to 1976.

Early years
Fletcher grew up in East Orange, New Jersey and attended East Orange High School.

References

1948 births
Living people
American football cornerbacks
East Orange High School alumni
People from Morristown, New Jersey
Sportspeople from East Orange, New Jersey
Temple Owls football players
San Diego Chargers players